Galineh-ye Kuchak (also Romanized as Galīneh-ye Kūchak; also known as Galīneh-ye Soflá) is a village in Baryaji Rural District, in the Central District of Sardasht County, West Azerbaijan Province, Iran. At the 2006 census, its population was 33, in 6 families.

References 

Populated places in Sardasht County